Self-portrait is one of the earliest works of Croatian artist Marino Tartaglia. He painted it in 1917, in the expressionist style.

Description
The painting is part of his first period in painting and measures 35.5 × 19 cm. It is held in the collections of the Museum of Contemporary Art, Zagreb.

References

Croatian paintings
Expressionist paintings
Tartaglia
Tartaglia
1917 paintings
Tartaglia